The 2018 FIBA Asia Champions Cup was the 27th staging of the FIBA Asia Champions Cup, the international basketball club tournament of FIBA Asia. The tournament, which was originally scheduled to be hosted by China, took place in Thailand from 27 September to 2 October 2018. Games were played at Stadium29 in Nonthaburi.

Qualification

Starting this year, there are a lot of changes in the qualification leading to the main tournament:

 There will be several qualifying rounds spread all across the continent, having the sub-zones scheduled their own qualifiers.
 One unique difference is some of Asia's top professional leagues will have their representatives already seeded in the Final Eight. China's Chinese Basketball Association, South Korea's Korean Basketball League, Japan's B.League and the Philippines' Philippine Basketball Association all have Direct Qualifying Spots to the Final 8.

Already qualified to the main tournament are the following nations:
 Liaoning Flying Leopards (2017–18 CBA season champions)
 Seoul SK Knights (2017–18 KBL season champions)
 Alvark Tokyo (2017–18 B.League season champions)
 Meralco Bolts (PBA representatives)
 Pauian (East Inter-Sub Zone qualifier)
 Mono Vampire (East Inter-Sub Zone qualifier)
 Sporting Al Riyadi Beirut (West Inter-Sub Zone qualifier)
 Petrochimi Bandar Imam BC (West Inter-Sub Zone qualifier)

Host 
The Basketball Association of Thailand was awarded the hosting duties. They assigned to Stadium 29 in the Bangkok suburb of Nonthaburi as the host of the tournament. The arena is the home of Mono Vampire in the Thailand Basketball League and in the ASEAN Basketball League.

Draw
The draw was held on September 14, at Stadium 29 at Nonthaburi. The eight teams were divided into two groups. Hosts Mono Vampire chose their own group after three teams were drawn.

Group phase
All times at Thailand Standard Time (UTC+7)

Group A

Group B

Classification round

5th-8th semifinals

Seventh place game

Fifth place game

Final round

Semifinals

Third place game

Final

Final ranking

Awards

All-Star Five

References

2018
Champions Cup
Champions Cup
International basketball competitions hosted by Thailand
FIBA Asia Champions Cup 
FIBA Asia Champions Cup